Michal Sáček (born 19 September 1996) is a Czech professional footballer who plays as a midfielder for Ekstraklasa club Jagiellonia Białystok.

Club career 
He made his career league debut for Sparta Prague on 14 May 2016 in a Czech First League 5–0 home win against Jihlava. While at Sparta Prague, he won the Revelation of the Year award for the 2016–17 Czech First League season.

On 2 February 2023, Polish club Jagiellonia Białystok announced the signing of Sáček on a two-and-a-half-year contract.

International career 
He was called up to the Czech national team on 2 June 2017 to face Belgium and Norway as a replacement for the injured Antonín Barák, but failed to make an appearance. He represented his country on the 2017 European Under-21 Championship. In the first match, a 0–2 loss to Germany, his defensive error led to a goal by Serge Gnabry.

He made his senior debut on 8 September 2021 in a friendly against Ukraine, a 1–1 home draw.

Career statistics

Club

References

Honours
Sparta Prague
Czech Cup: 2019–20

External links 
 
 Michal Sáček official international statistics
 

1996 births
Living people
People from Hustopeče
Sportspeople from the South Moravian Region
Czech footballers
Association football midfielders
Czech First League players
Czech National Football League players
AC Sparta Prague players
Jagiellonia Białystok players
Czech Republic youth international footballers
Czech Republic under-21 international footballers
Czech Republic international footballers
Czech expatriate footballers
Expatriate footballers in Poland
Czech expatriate sportspeople in Poland